Surigao's at-large congressional district may refer to several occasions when a provincewide at-large district was used for elections to the various Philippine national legislatures from the historical province of Surigao.

The territory of the former Spanish colonial district of Surigao was first represented in the National Assembly of the First Philippine Republic known as the Malolos Congress. Following the establishment of a provincial government under U.S. civilian rule in 1901, a single-member district encompassing the entire province was created ahead of the elections for the first fully elected Philippine Assembly in 1907. The district also elected its representatives to the Commonwealth National Assembly following a shift to unicameral legislature in 1935, and was re-established as a plural member constituency ahead of the 1943 election for the Second Republic National Assembly. It elected a representative to the restored House of Representatives when the country returned to single-member electorates in 1945 and was also represented in the first four meetings under the Third Philippine Republic.

The district was abolished following the 1960 division of Surigao into two provinces which took effect in 1961.

Representation history

See also
Legislative districts of Surigao del Norte
Legislative districts of Surigao del Sur

References

Former congressional districts of the Philippines
Politics of Surigao del Norte
Politics of Surigao del Sur
1898 establishments in the Philippines
1907 establishments in the Philippines
1961 disestablishments in the Philippines
At-large congressional districts of the Philippines
Congressional districts of Caraga
Constituencies established in 1898
Constituencies disestablished in 1901
Constituencies established in 1907
Constituencies disestablished in 1960